Via Rail's Toronto Maintenance Centre is a railway yard in the western end of Toronto, which stores and services Via trains. It lies within the south side of the former CN Mimico Yard directly opposite of the Willowbrook Rail Maintenance Facility on the north side; GO Transit's Lakeshore West line separates the two facilities. The yard is bisected by the Islington Avenue flyover bridge. Its main entrance is located at 50 Drummond Street on the eastern side with a secondary entrance on its southern side along New Toronto Street at Eighth Street.

The west end of the yard has an operational railway turntable. A large turnaround wye has been constructed out of an industrial spur on the eastern side that formerly served the Campbell Soup Company plant.

In 1976, Via Rail took over the passenger services of both Canadian National Railway and Canadian Pacific Railway. Originally, Via performed maintenance in Toronto at the CNR Spadina Roundhouse and CPR John Street Roundhouse, both just west of Union Station. In 1985, Via moved to its current maintenance facility in the southern half of the Mimico Yard.

Mimico Yard
Both the Via Toronto Maintenance Centre and GO Transit's Willowbrook Rail Maintenance Facility lie in south and north halves respectively of the Mimico Yard. The northern part of the yard is also called the Willowbrook Yard after the nearby Willowbrook Road.

In 1906, the Grand Trunk Railway built the  Mimico Yard. In 1913, the GTR built a 34-stall roundhouse, a coaling tower and water towers on the south side of the yard. The yard exclusively serviced freight trains, and had facilities to maintain and repair freight cars. Freight trains were assembled and dispatched from the yard. Unlike today, the mainline ran along the north edge of the Mimico Yard.

In 1923, the Canadian National Railway (CN) took over the yard along with the Grand Trunk Railway. In 1965, CN moved most of the yard's functions to the then-new MacMillan Yard in Maple, Ontario.

The Mimico Roundhouse survived to the diesel area, but part of it was rented out to tenants. In March 1965, a fire partly destroyed the roundhouse with the remainder being demolished by 1969. Today, a turntable sits at the site of the former roundhouse, but it was built years after the roundhouse's demolition.

GO Transit started using the Mimico Yard in 1967, and in 1978 opened its Willowbrook Rail Maintenance Facility in the Willowbrook Yard, the name given to the northern half of the Mimico Yard. In 1985, Via Rail opened its Toronto Maintenance Centre in the southern half of the yard. By this time, the mainline was running through the middle of the Mimico Yard, separating the GO Transit and Via Rail facilities.

References

Via Rail
Rail yards in Toronto